Veliko Gradište is a town and municipality located in the Braničevo District of the eastern Serbia. It is situated the right bank of the Danube river and left bank of the Pek river. In 2011, the town has a total population of 6,204, while the municipality has 17,610.

Name
The name means "large construction site" in Serbian. Names in other languages: .

History
Thracians and Dacians lived in the region prior to the Roman conquering of the Balkans in the 1st century BC, when the town was known as "Pincum", in the province of Upper Moesia. The Pincum relief of the Trojan Cycle depicting Achilles and Hector was found in Ritopek.

Settlements
Aside from the town of Veliko Gradište, the municipality includes the following settlements:

 Biskuplje
 Veliko Gradište
 Garevo
 Desine
 Doljašnica
 Đurakovo
 Zatonje
 Kamijevo
 Kisiljevo
 Kumane
 Kurjače
 Kusiće
 Ljubinje
 Majilovac
 Makce
 Ostrovo
 Pečanica
 Požeženo
 Popovac
 Ram
 Sirakovo
 Srednjevo
 Topolovnik
 Tribrode
 Carevac
 Češljeva Bara

Demographics
As of 2011 census, the municipality has 17,610 inhabitants.

Ethnic groups
The ethnic composition of the municipality is given in the following table (as of 2011 census):

Climate

Economy
The following table gives a preview of total number of registered people employed in legal entities per their core activity (as of 2018):

Notable people
 Žanka Stokić, actress
 Philip Zepter, businessman

See also
 List of places in Serbia

References

External links 

 

Populated places in Braničevo District
Municipalities and cities of Southern and Eastern Serbia